Minuscule 83 (in the Gregory-Aland numbering), ε 1218 (Soden), is a Greek minuscule manuscript of the New Testament, on parchment leaves. Palaeographically it has been assigned to the 11th century. It was adapted for liturgical use. It has marginalia.

Description 

The codex contains the complete text of the four Gospels, with a commentary, on 321 leaves (size ). The text is written stichometrically in one column per page, 20-21 lines per page (size of text 13.6 by 9.5 cm), 
in  beautiful letters.

The passage of John 7:53-8:11 is marked with an obelus (÷).

Text 

The Greek text of the codex is a representative of the Byzantine text-type. Aland placed it in Category V. Hermann von Soden classified it to the textual family Kr. According to the Claremont Profile Method it belongs to the textual family Kr in Luke 1, 10, and 20.

History 

Formerly the manuscript was held in Augsburg (as codices 84 and 85). It was examined by Bengel (as August 1), Scholz, and Burgon. C. R. Gregory saw it in 1887.

It is currently housed in at the Bavarian State Library (Gr. 518), at Munich.

See also 

 List of New Testament minuscules
 Biblical manuscript
 Textual criticism

References

Further reading

External links 
 R. Waltz, Minuscule 83 at the Encyclopedia of Textual Criticism

Greek New Testament minuscules
11th-century biblical manuscripts